The 1972 ECAC Hockey Men's Ice Hockey Tournament was the 11th tournament in league history. It was played between March 7 and March 11, 1972. Quarterfinal games were played at home team campus sites, while the 'final four' games were played at the Boston Garden in Boston, Massachusetts. By reaching the championship game both, Boston University and Cornell received invitations to participate in the 1972 NCAA Division I Men's Ice Hockey Tournament.

Format
The tournament featured three rounds of play, all of which were single-elimination. The top eight teams, based on winning percentage, qualified to participate in the tournament. In the quarterfinals the first seed and eighth seed, the second seed and seventh seed, the third seed and sixth seed and the fourth seed and fifth seed played against one another. In the semifinals, the highest seed plays the lowest remaining seed while the two remaining teams play with the winners advancing to the championship game and the losers advancing to the third place game.

Conference standings
Note: GP = Games played; W = Wins; L = Losses; T = Ties; Pct. = Winning percentage; GF = Goals for; GA = Goals against

Bracket
Teams are reseeded after the first round

Note: * denotes overtime period(s)

Quarterfinals

(1) Cornell vs. (8) Providence

(2) Boston University vs. (7) Rensselaer

(3) Harvard vs. (6) Clarkson

(4) Pennsylvania vs. (5) New Hampshire

Semifinals

(1) Cornell vs. (5) New Hampshire

(2) Boston University vs. (3) Harvard

Third Place

(3) Harvard vs. (5) New Hampshire

Championship

(1) Cornell vs. (2) Boston University

Tournament awards

All-Tournament Team

First Team
F Dave Wisener (Boston University)
F Don Cahoon (Boston University)
F Larry Fullan (Cornell)
F John Danby* (Boston University)
D Jim Higgs (Cornell)
D Bob Brown (Boston University)
G Dan Brady (Boston University)
* Most Outstanding Player(s)

Second Team
F Bill Hanson (Cornell)
F Guy Smith (New Hampshire)
F Carlo Ugolini (Cornell)
D Mark Noonan (Harvard)
D Ric Jordan (Boston University)
G Bob Smith (New Hampshire)

References

External links
ECAC Hockey
1971–72 ECAC Hockey Standings
1971–72 NCAA Standings

ECAC Hockey Men's Ice Hockey Tournament
ECAC